Simultaneous hermaphroditism is one of the two types of hermaphroditism, the other type being sequential hermaphroditism. In this form of hermaphroditism an individual has sex organs of both sexes and can produce both gamete types even in the same breeding season.

The distinction between simultaneous hermaphroditism and sequential hermaphroditism isn’t always clear. But unlike sequential hermaphrodites, simultaneous hermaphrodites are both male and female at sexual maturity. Also sex determination does not apply to simultaneous hermaphrodites (except in species with mix mating systems).

In simultaneous hermaphrodites, self-fertilization is possible in some species, where in others it is absent.

Plants 

Most plants are simultaneous hermaphrodites with it occurring in 80% of angiosperms.

Animals 

Simultaneous hermaphroditism is one of the most common sexual systems in animals. The majority of Cocculinoidea are simultaneous hermaphrodites and it occurs in over 67% of coral species.

The primary model explaining the evolution of simultaneous hermaphroditism from gonochorism (separate sexes) in animals is the low density model. This model explains simultaneous hermaphroditism as a reproductive adaptation to limited mating opportunities. This is advantageous to simultaneous hermaphrodites that can self-fertilize, because they are able to reproduce even if they fail to find a sexual partner. The low density model is helpful for understanding the development of simultaneous hermaphroditism in many animal species. For example, in crustaceans simultaneous hermaphroditism can be found in groups that are sessile or live in environments with limited mating opportunities.

References 

Sexual system
Reproductive system
Sexual reproduction